The 2016 Espirito Santo Trophy took place 14–17 September at Mayakoba El Camaleon Golf Club and Iberostar Playa Paraiso Golf Club in Playa del Carmen, Quintana Roo, Mexico. 

It was the 27th women's golf World Amateur Team Championship for the Espirito Santo Trophy.

The tournament was a 72-hole stroke play team event. There were a record 55 team entries, each with up to three players. Two nations, Bulgaria and Morocco, made their first appearances at the Espirito Santo Trophy.

Each team played two rounds at Mayakoba and two rounds at Iberostar in different orders, but all leading teams played the fourth round at Mayakoba. The best two scores for each round counted towards the team total.

The South Korea team won the trophy for their fourth title and third win in the last four events, beating team Switzerland by 21 strokes. Switzerland, with two sisters, Kim and Morgan Metraux, in the team, earned the silver medal while the Ireland team took the bronze on third place another stroke back.

The individual title went to 17-year-old  Choi Hye-jin, South Korea, whose score of 14-under-par, 274, was two strokes ahead of Puk Lyng Thomsen, Denmark.

Teams 
55 teams entered the event and completed the competition. Each team had three players except two teams. The teams representing Bolivia and Latvia each had only two players.

Results 

Source:

Individual leaders 
There was no official recognition for the lowest individual scores.

References

External link
World Amateur Team Championships on International Golf Federation website

Espirito Santo Trophy
Golf tournaments in Mexico
Espirito Santo Trophy
Espirito Santo Trophy
Espirito Santo Trophy